Tsypkin is a surname. Notable people with the name include:

 Alter Tsypkin (1891–1985), Soviet legal scholar, lawyer
 Leonid Tsypkin (1926–1982), Soviet writer and medical doctor, best known for his book Summer in Baden-Baden